The 2016 Preakness Stakes (in full, the Xpressbet.com Preakness Stakes, due to sponsorship) was the 141st running of the Preakness Stakes. The race was held on May 21, 2016, and was scheduled to be run at 6:45 pm Eastern Daylight Time (EDT) and was televised on NBC. Exaggerator won the race, while 2016 Kentucky Derby winner Nyquist finished third. The Maryland Jockey Club reported a track record total attendance of 135,256, the second highest attendance for American thoroughbred racing events in North America during 2016.

Field
After the running of the Kentucky Derby connections of the winner Nyquist sent the horse to Pimlico on 9 May. Other runners from the Derby included second placed Exaggerator, who arrived at Pimlico on May 15, and 9th placed Lani.  Of the other 17 Derby contenders, Gun Runner remained under consideration until Tuesday of Preakness week, then his trainer decided to rest him and train for races later in the summer instead. Derby contenders Brody's Cause and Suddenbreakingnews were set to skip the Preakness and point to the 2016 Belmont Stakes.

A total of eight new horses who did not contest the Derby were pointed at the Preakness.  Awesome Speed, who won the Federico Tesio Stakes at Laurel Park, earned an automatic entry to the Preakness. Other new contenders included Cherry Wine and Laoban, both Derby also-eligibles who were not able to start in the Kentucky race.   Of the horses who had not been on the Kentucky Derby trail, Stradivari, a lightly-raced colt trained by Todd Pletcher, Collected, a Bob Baffert-trainee who won the Lexington Stakes, and Uncle Lino, a west coast horse who won the inaugural California Chrome Stakes drew press interest.  Abiding Star was in question for a time, as he was stabled at Parx Racing, which was under a quarantine due to an outbreak of EHV-1 at that track.  However, the quarantine was lifted on May 17, allowing him to ship to Pimlico and enter the race.

The draw for the race was held at 5:30 pm (EDT) on May 18 and Nyqist was installed as the 3-5 morning line favorite.

Race

On a rainy day, the race went off at 6:52 PM, EST.  In spite of the weather, attendance was a record-breaking 135,256, beating the previous year's record of 131,680.  The pari-mutuel take of $94,127,434 for the entire day's races also broke the previous record of $91,028,000 in 2005.

On a sloppy but sealed track, Nyquist fell prey to a blistering early pace set by Uncle Lino.  He led briefly at the 1/2 mile pole, but by the stretch he faded, and Exaggerator won by  lengths.  The second-place finisher, Cherry Wine, had hit his head on the starting gate and was second-to-last for much of the race but saved ground on the rail and rallied in the stretch to take second place over Nyquist by a nose, thus destroying any chance for the first back-to-back Triple Crown winners since 1977–78.

Entries

 Winning owner and breeder: Big Chief Racing, LLC, Head of Plains Partners LLC, Rocker O Ranch, LLC et al. Breeder: Joseph B. Murphy
 Final time: 1:58.31
 Margins:  lengths, nose.
 Track: Sloppy (sealed)
  135,256 (record at the time)

Payout

The 141st Preakness payout schedule

 $2 Exacta (5-1) $88.40
 $2 Trifecta (5-1-3) $146.20
 $1 Superfecta (5-1-3-11) $317.00

See also

 2016 Kentucky Derby
2016 Belmont Stakes

References

2016
2016 in horse racing
2016 in American sports
2016 in sports in Maryland
May 2016 sports events in the United States
Horse races in Maryland